Jukumarini (Aymara jukumari bear, -ni a suffix, "the one with a bear", also spelled Jucumarini) is a  mountain in the Bolivian Andes. It is located in the La Paz Department, Loayza Province, Luribay Municipality.

References 

Mountains of La Paz Department (Bolivia)